Manifesto of Arch Enemy is a compilation album by Swedish melodic death metal band Arch Enemy, featuring two songs from Wages of Sin, two from Anthems of Rebellion, two from Doomsday Machine, two from Rise of the Tyrant, and two from the live album Tyrants of the Rising Sun. It was released on 27 February 2009 on Century Media Records.

Track listing

Credits

Band members
Angela Gossow – vocals
Michael Amott – guitar and backing vocals
Christopher Amott – guitar
Sharlee D'Angelo – bass
Daniel Erlandsson – drums

Production
Arch Enemy – production
Andy Sneap – production (tracks #2 and #7), mixing and mastering (tracks #1 and #6)
Fredrik Nordström – production (tracks #3, #4, #8, and #9)
Rickard Bengtsson – production (tracks #1 and #6)

References

Arch Enemy albums
2009 compilation albums
Albums produced by Fredrik Nordström
Century Media Records compilation albums